Petrophila darsanialis is a moth in the family Crambidae. It was described by Herbert Druce in 1896. It is found in Panama.

References

Petrophila
Moths described in 1896